Artyom Ntumba Muamba (born 19 April 2003) is a Russian football player of Congolese descent. He plays for FC Veles Moscow on loan from FC Rostov.

Club career
He made his debut in the Russian Premier League for FC Rostov on 21 May 2022 in a game against PFC CSKA Moscow.

Career statistics

References

External links
 
 
 

2003 births
Living people
Russian footballers
Russian people of Democratic Republic of the Congo descent
Footballers from Moscow
Association football forwards
FC Rostov players
FC Veles Moscow players
Russian Premier League players